Grace Kristine Singson-Meehan (Grace Kristine Gacula Singson; 21 November) also known as Kris Singson-Meehan, Kristine Singson is a Filipina politician and businesswoman she is Member of the Philippine House of Representatives from Ilocos Sur's 2nd District. She succeed her father Eric Singson in 2019.

References 

Year of birth missing (living people)
Living people
Members of the House of Representatives of the Philippines
Women members of the House of Representatives of the Philippines
Members of the House of Representatives of the Philippines from Ilocos Sur
Nationalist People's Coalition politicians
21st-century Filipino women politicians
Women legislative deputy speakers
21st-century Filipino politicians